Anya "Anna" Velikiy (born December 10, 1982) is a Soviet Uzbek-born Israeli female former volleyball player, who played as a right side hitter. She captained the Israel women's national volleyball team.

She competed at the 2011 Women's European Volleyball Championship.

She immigrated to Israel in 2006.

She played for Czech club VK Prostějov. She also played for Israeli volleyball club Hapoel Kfar Saba.

References

External links
http://www.cev.lu/Competition-Area/PlayerDetails.aspx?TeamID=8624&PlayerID=2321&ID=701
http://www.scoresway.com/?sport=volleyball&page=player&id=2421
http://www.zimbio.com/pictures/q033iK-goHO/Women+Volleyball+European+Championship+Israel/HlakjS7TycO/Anna+Velikiy

1982 births
Living people
Israeli women's volleyball players
Place of birth missing (living people)
Israeli people of Uzbekistani descent
Israeli people of Soviet descent
Uzbekistani emigrants to Israel
Soviet emigrants to Israel